Women are Weak is a 1959 French-Italian film featuring Alain Delon. It was one of his first roles and was crucial to launching him as a star. It was also known as Three Murderesses.

The movie was a success at the French box office and achieved release in the US. Delon made some personal appearances in New York to promote the movie.

Cast 
 Alain Delon as Julien Fenal 
 Mylène Demongeot as Sabine 
 Pascale Petit as  Agathe 
 Jacqueline Sassard as Hélène Maroni 
 Simone Renant as Marguerite Maroni 
 Monique Mélinand as Madame Fenal 
 Héléna Manson as la mère supérieure 
 Pierre Mondy as André  
 Noël Roquevert as Édouard Maroni 
  Albert Médina as Monsieur Courcel 
  Anita Ruff as Anita Pérez 
  Adrienne Servantie as Madame Courcel 
 André Luguet as Monsieur Fenal 
 Magdeleine Bérubet as Sister Marguerite   
 Yves Barsacq

References

External links

Review of film at New York Times

1959 films
French comedy films
Italian comedy films
1959 comedy films
1950s French-language films
1950s Italian films
1950s French films